Dale Henderson (born January 8, 1966) is an American musician. He is best known as the frontman and guitarist of the crossover thrash band Beowülf where he is the only constant member. He composed the music and wrote the lyrics on all of Beowülf's albums.

Biography 
Henderson's musical career began in 1981 when he joined the local punk band Black Sheep. The band also consisted of former Neighborhood Watch former Mike Jensen, Paul Yamada on bass and Mike Jensen's cousin, Roger DeGiacomi, on drums. The band played many parties, bars and clubs in Venice in 1981–1982 before DeGiacomi became the band manager and was replaced by Michael Alvarado on drums in 1983, changing the name of the band to Beowülf or BWF (The F being inverted) as they wrote it in Venice "graffiti slang".

Beowülf recorded two albums in the 1980s: Beowülf (1986) and Lost My Head... But I'm Back on the Right Track (1988). They had achieved small success with those albums, but difficulty keeping his bandmates together caused them to disband around 1989; it was the first of many splits. Henderson restarted Beowülf some time later with a renewed lineup. The band signed with Restless Records in 1992 to release two more albums, Un-Sentimental (1993) and 2 Cents (1995), before breaking up once again in 1995. After that split, Henderson started Kool-Whip, who played clubs and released two albums The Now (2000), which was nominated for best rock album at the 2002 L.A. Music Awards, and Dirty Movie (2007).

In the early 2000s, Henderson resurrected Beowülf once again and continues to record and perform with them.

References

External links 
Facebook page

1966 births
Living people
American rock singers
American rock guitarists
American male guitarists
20th-century American guitarists
20th-century American male musicians